Uetakevirus is a genus of viruses in the order Caudovirales, in the family Podoviridae. Bacteria serve as natural hosts. There are three species in this genus. These phages are temperate and infect Salmonella (Salmonella virus Epsilon15) and Escherichia coli (Escherichia phage PhiV10).

Taxonomy
The following three species are assigned to the genus:
 Escherichia virus phiV10
 Salmonella virus Epsilon15
 Salmonella virus SPN1S

Structure
Viruses in Uetakevirus are non-enveloped, with icosahedral and  Head-tail geometries, and T=7 symmetry. The diameter is around 70 nm with a short tail of about 15 nm and tailspikes surrounding an external tail hub.
The genomes of these phages are linear double stranded DNA (~40kilobases), terminally redundant and circularly permuted. Transcriptional units separate the genome in an early and a late region, one on the negative strand (regulation and recombination) and the one on the positive strand (packaging, morphogenesis, lysis and integration). Genomes are around 40kb in length.

Life cycle
Viral replication is cytoplasmic. Entry into the host cell is achieved by adsorption into the host cell. Dna templated transcription is the method of transcription. Bacteria serve as the natural host. Transmission routes are passive diffusion.

References

External links
 Viralzone: Epsilon15likevirus
 ICTV

Podoviridae
Virus genera